"White Summer and Green Bicycle, Red Hair with Black Guitar." is a song and single by the Japanese, alternative rock band The Pillows. Neither the single nor Thank You, My Twilight (the album it appears on) were released outside Japan. The album was produced by Zin Yoshida of Salon Music.

Development
"White Summer and Green Bicycle, Red Hair with Black Guitar." is based on Sawao Yamanaka's lonely adolescence growing up in Hokkaidō. This viewpoint is most clearly reflected in the third verse.

Despite this, Yamanaka has stated that he wrote "White Summer" for the group and not as a personal song for himself, saying, "I just make music for life."

Out of about four songs from the demo album The Pillows was working on at the time, "Babylon Verses of Angel" was Yamanaka's choice for the single release. However, the director, producer, and others pushed for "White Summer". Since the original version has a minute and a half intro, it had to be cut down for its single release. It was for this reason that Yamanaka was initially opposed to "White Summer" as a single, as "Babylon Verses of Angel" would not have required editing.

Music video

The music video for "White Summer and Green Bicycle, Red Hair with Black Guitar. (display version)" features a comet-tailed goldfish−the same featured on the single's cover−swimming around in a kitchen and bedroom, later also swimming around the band as they play against a white background. Short clips of a young boy riding a green bicycle are also shown at times, though no person with red hair, nor any black guitars are featured in the music video.

Versions and releases
The 4:06 "display version" of "White Summer" was first released in the maxi single format and is the version that appears in the DVD Dead Stock Paradise and compilation album Lostman Go to Yesterday. The 5:50 "original egotistic version" is featured in the 2002 album Thank You, My Twilight. Another version known as the "FooL on CooL version" was recorded for FLCL and featured in the 2018 album FooL on CooL generation.

Notes and references

However, the English title is what appears on the single's cover.
b: While not explicitly stated, it would seem that the demo album would become Thank You, My Twilight and the four songs being considered for release as a single were "Babylon Verses of Angel"; Thank You, My Twilight"; "Rain Brain"; and "White Summer and Green Bicycle, Red Hair with Black Guitar."

External links
Page at official site. 

2002 singles
The Pillows songs